Maxime Rouyer (born July 16, 1994) is a French professional gridiron football linebacker for the BC Lions of the Canadian Football League (CFL). He has also played for the Edmonton Elks of the CFL and the Panthers Wrocław of the European League of Football (ELF).

College career
Born in Troyes, where he started practicing gridiron football with Pygargues de Troyes when he was sixteen, Rouyer moved to Canada and started playing Canadian football, first, two seasons at the Cégep de Jonquière. He then played U Sports football from 2015 to 2018, for the McGill Redmen, while also earning a major in Physical Education & Health. During his time as a linebacker for the Redmen, Rouyer played 23 games and recorded 103 total tackles and 4.5 quarterback sacks.

Professional career

Edmonton Eskimos / Elks
Rouyer was selected by the Edmonton Eskimos as the fourth overall selection of the 2019 European CFL Draft and was signed by the team on May 16, 2019. He made the team's active roster following training camp and made his professional debut on June 14, 2019, against the Montreal Alouettes. Rouyer played in 17 regular season games and was credited with three special teams tackles, as well as both playoff games where he recorded another special teams tackle. In the final regular season game of the year, Rouyer and teammate Diego Viamontes became the first Global teammates to be active in the same game.

Rouyer did not play in 2020 following the cancellation of the 2020 CFL season. He re-signed with Edmonton on a contract extension through 2021 on December 26, 2020. He played in one regular season in 2021 where he had one special teams tackle. He was released on February 28, 2022.

Panthers Wrocław
On May 19, 2022, the Panthers Wrocław announced that Rouyer had joined their 2022 roster. He had 89 tackles, 4.5 sacks, and three fumble recoveries, including one that he returned for a touchdown.

BC Lions
Following the end of the Panthers' 2022 season, Rouyer signed with the BC Lions on September 14, 2022.

References

External links
BC Lions bio
ELF bio

1994 births
Living people
American football linebackers
BC Lions players
Canadian football linebackers
Edmonton Elks players
Panthers Wrocław players
French players of Canadian football
French expatriate sportspeople in Canada
French expatriate sportspeople in Poland
McGill Redbirds football players
Sportspeople from Troyes
French players of American football